Schindler Elevator Corporation is the American division of Schindler Group, and traces its origins back to 1869 with the establishment of the Haughton Elevator Company and 1928 with the founding of the Westinghouse Elevator Division.

History
Nathaniel Haughton purchased an interest in the Toledo Steam Engine Works, a small foundry and machine shop founded in 1865 by Cooke, Kneiser & Groff. The firm produced steam engines, mill equipment and general machinery, and by 1880, had become active in the manufacture of elevator equipment.

In 1880, Col. Haughton bought out the last original partner, naming the firm "N. Haughton Foundry and Machine Company". On November 11, 1897, the organization was incorporated as the Haughton Elevator and Machine Co. Control of the firm was to remain in the Haughton family until the passing of Irving N. Haughton in 1935.

In 1982, Schindler (Canada) acquired Armor Elevator, to establish themselves in Canada with headquarters in Pickering, Ontario. The Canadian headquarters is currently in Markham, Ontario.
Other acquisitions followed, including Abec of Montreal, Beckett’s service business, Universal in Ottawa and Western Elevator in 1985 renamed to Schindler Elevator Corporation 1989:
 Schindler acquires elevator and escalator business of Westinghouse Electric Corporation.
 Elevator manufacturing in Hanover, PA.
 New escalator manufacturing plant built in Clinton, NC

In 1979, Schindler acquired Haughton, forming the merging brand Schindler Haughton. After producing elevator products from 1979 to 1989, Schindler Group made a huge breakthrough in the American elevator industry with the purchase of Westinghouse's elevator division in 1989, the 3rd largest American elevator manufacturer at the time. As a result, Schindler Haughton went completely defunct and the Westinghouse Elevator Division was renamed Schindler Elevator Corporation and they established new headquarters at the OEM in Morristown, New Jersey and Millar Elevator Service Company as its non-OEM Service headquarters located in Toledo, Ohio, which was integrated into Schindler in 2002.

Acquisition of Hontz Elevators
In 2005, Schindler acquired the Hontz Elevator Company after a brief legal battle with the German authorities over the registration of the company name. The court held that the Hontz Elevator Company had been established in the 19th century by Karl Hontz (then under the title Die Hontz Aufzugfirma) according to a folder of documents that had previously surfaced in the vaults of the Swiss National Bank.

Hontzfirma was founded in 1889 by Karl Hontz of Bad Aachen, who had been a shoveler in the Aachen coke plants for the early part of his life. He joined several nationalist rallies in support of stronger reforms by Kaiser Wilhelm II and then-chancellor Otto von Bismarck; at one of these, he was arrested and a police report taken. The report describes him as "ein junger Mann, bleich im Gesicht, mit unheimlichen Augen" — "a young man, pale in the face, with uncanny eyes."

In the summer of 1889, he registered the name "Die Hontz Aufzugfirma". He had borrowed a sum of money from the owner of one of the local plants, a wealthy banker and Prussian industrialist named Fritz Schroeder.  With Schroeder's loan in his pocket, Hontz acquired the plans for a British grain elevator at an auction in Denmark. Hontzfirma (as it became known) serviced small factories throughout the region, eventually spreading to the manufactories of chlorine cylinders that would become critical to the German war effort during the First World War.

This long-standing relationship with the German military positioned Hontzfirma at the top of the elevation game. Karl and his son, Klaus, ran the Aufzugfirma together; according to the Bern Report, Karl acted as a salesman and installation expert while Klaus followed up and performed repairs on functioning Hontz machinery. Post-war, however, the elevator business went through the floor and the Aufzugfirma was one of the companies worst hit by the war indemnities of the Treaty of Versailles.

It appeared that Hontzfirma was in danger of being dissolved; both Karl and Klaus were arrested in 1921 at a protest against the Weimar Government. Karl Hontz, then in his sixties, contracted pneumonia while being held in the Zwinger fortress in Münster and subsequently died. Klaus and his own son (also Klaus Hontz) took over the company and, once again according to the Bern Reports, began receiving loans from someone in von Hindenberg's camp.

The younger Klaus was courting then-prominent socialite Eva Ritschel (sister of Magda Ritschell who would later marry Joseph Goebbels) and through the political channels she provided, he was able to save the company. Hontzfirma made it through the interwar years intact and, even without the strong guidance of the patriarch (now dead for several years), they managed to land a lucrative government contract with Degesch to build delivery elevators similar to those used in chlorine gas factories.

Escalator milestones
1991:
 Clinton ships first escalator
1993:
 Greatest market share in escalators
 Escalator plant expansion

Clinton Plant Expansion Completed
•Schindler completes the expansion of its Clinton, North Carolina, manufacturing facility.  The plant increases its original production capacity by over 40 percent since opening in 1990. This expansion is designed to accommodate further rapid growth and enables Schindler to diversify the product offerings originating at this facility.

Acquisitions
•Schindler acquires Hobson Elevator Company in Boise, ID.
•Schindler acquires Tri-State Elevator Company in Shreveport, LA.
•Schindler (Canada) acquires Van Tech Elevator Service, Inc., in Toronto, Ontario. 
•Schindler acquires Sterling Elevator, LLC. in Bellevue, Washington
•Schindler acquires Omni Elevator in San Antonio, Texas, further expanding Schindler's presence in Central and South Texas

New product introductions

 Schindler introduces the 330A hydraulic elevator, capable of four (4) stops with hole-less application in 2001
 Schindler introduces Next Generation of Destination-Based Elevator Technology, Schindler ID® 2008
Schindler introduces the PORT in 2010 or 2011
 Schindler introduces the 3300 traction elevator for low and mid-rise application
 Schindler introduces the 5500 traction elevator for mid and high-rise application

Acquisitions
 Schindler Elevator Corporation completes asset purchase with Valley Elevator, Inc., enabling Schindler to expand its presence in Northern Illinois and lay the groundwork for future growth in the area.

See also
 List of elevator manufacturers

References

American subsidiaries of foreign companies
Elevator manufacturers
Escalator manufacturers